James Brougham (16 January 1780 – 22 December 1833) was a British Whig politician.

Background
Brougham was the second son of Henry Brougham and his wife Eleanor. She was the daughter of James Syme and the niece of William Robertson. His older brother was  Henry Brougham, 1st Baron Brougham and Vaux, who served as Lord Chancellor, and one of his younger brothers was William Brougham, 2nd Baron Brougham and Vaux, who sat also in the Parliament of the United Kingdom as well as succeeded in the barony.

Career
Brougham entered the British House of Commons in 1826, having been elected for Tregony. He represented the constituency until 1830 and sat then for Downton in the following year. In 1831, he was returned for Winchelsea. After a year the constituency was abolished and Brougham stood successfully for Kendal, which had been established by the Reform Act 1832. In the same year his brother Henry made him Registrar of Affidavits as well as Clerk of Letters Patent. Both offices were provided with a high salary and were executed by deputies. Brougham died in the next year at Brougham Hall, unmarried and childless, aged 53. His burial took place in Skelton, Cumbria and was only attended by his brothers.

Notes

References

External links

1780 births
1833 deaths
Cumbria MPs
Members of the Parliament of the United Kingdom for constituencies in Cornwall
Members of the Parliament of the United Kingdom for constituencies in Wiltshire
UK MPs 1826–1830
UK MPs 1830–1831
UK MPs 1831–1832
UK MPs 1832–1835
Whig (British political party) MPs for English constituencies